The NCAA Division I men's basketball tournament is a basketball tournament that has been played annually since 1939. Teams were placed in the tournament based on their records and performance against other teams. The spots in which the teams were placed are referred to as "seeds." When the tournament first started, only eight teams competed in the tournament and seeds were assigned 1–8. As the number of teams in the tournament grew, more seeds were added. Currently, 68 teams compete in the tournament and seeds are assigned 1–16 in four regional brackets. This list is a compilation of the seeds held by teams each time they competed in the tournament.

Special information
 There were eight teams in the tournament from 1939 to 1950 
 There were sixteen teams in the tournament in 1951 and 1952 
 There were twenty-two teams in the tournament in 1953 and 1966
 There were twenty-three teams in the tournament in 1957, 1959, 1965, 1967, and 1968
 There were twenty-four teams in the tournament in 1954, 1955, 1958, and 1961 
 There were twenty-five teams in the tournament in 1956, 1960, 1962, 1963, 1969,1970,1971, and 1972
 There were twenty-six teams in the tournament in 1964
 Teams were assigned seeds 1-8 from 1939 to 1972

School appearances by seed list
 ***year indicates a championship victory
 **year indicates a championship appearance
 *year indicates a final four appearance

References

NCAA Division I men's basketball tournament